The 2003 Fiji rugby union tours  were two series of matches played between June and August 2003 in Australia, New Zealand and South America by Fiji national rugby union team.

The matches were played in two different periods: in June in Australia (no test match) and in August in New Zealand (no test) and South America (two full international matches).

In Australia

In New Zealand

In South America 

Argentina: Bernardo Stortoni, 14. Hernán Senillosa, 13. Manuel Contepomi, 12. Martín Gaitán, 11. Ignacio Corleto, 10. Juan Fernández Miranda, 9. Matias Albina, 8. Rodrigo Roncero, 7. Federico Méndez, 6. Martín Scelzo, 5. Mariano Sambucetti, 4. Santiago Phelan , 3. Rimas Álvarez Kairelis, 2. Martín Schusterman, 1. Gonzalo Longo (c) – Replacements: Martín Durand, Pedro Sporleder, Mauricio Reggiardo – Unused: Agustín Pichot, Gonzalo Quesada, José Orengo

Fiji: 15. Norman Ligairi, 14. Sekove Leawere, 13. Aisea Tuilevu Kurimudu, 12. Seru Rabeni, 11. Rupeni Caucaunibuca, 10. Nicky Little, 9. Moses Rauluni, 8. Alfi Mocelutu Vuivau , 7. Kitione Salawa, 6. Sisa Koyamaibole, 5. Kele Leawere, 4. Emori Katalau (c), 3. Joeli Veitayaki, 2. Bill Gadolo, 1. Richard Nyholt – Replacements: 16. Naka Seru, 17. Isaia Rasila, 18. Ifereimi Rawaqa, 19. Koli Sewabu, 20. Vula Maimuri, 21. Waisale Serevi

2003 rugby union tours
tour
2003
2003 in Argentine rugby union
2003 in Australian rugby union
2003 in New Zealand rugby union
Rugby union tours of Argentina
Rugby union tours of New Zealand
Rugby union tours of Chile
Rugby union